(Giuseppe) Mario Sammarco (13 December 1868, although some sources say 1867 – 24 January 1930) was an Italian operatic baritone noted for his acting ability.

Biography
Sammarco was born in Palermo, Sicily, and studied locally with Antonio Cantelli. He made his operatic début in Palermo as Valentine in Faust in 1888. He subsequently sang to acclaim in Milan (at La Scala, Italy's most celebrated theatre), Buenos Aires and London. Between 1904 and 1919 he appeared intermittently, in 26 different roles, at the Royal Opera House, Covent Garden.

In New York City, he was hired by Oscar Hammerstein I for his Manhattan Opera Company as a replacement for the great French singing-actor Maurice Renaud. He sang with the Manhattan company in 1908–1910, becoming its principal Italian baritone, but he never 'graduated' to the rival Metropolitan Opera.

Sammarco next joined the Chicago–Philadelphia opera company. His career there continued smoothly enough until 1913 when he encountered a disapproving Mary Garden in a Chicago production of Tosca. The soprano requested that he be replaced; but after he named some of his former distinguished (and uncomplaining) Tosca partners, notably Emmy Destinn, the performances proceeded to be given to critical success.

His final operatic appearances were at the Teatro di San Carlo in Naples in 1919.

Apart from Scarpia (his debut role at Covent Garden), he was a famous Rigoletto, Marcello, Germont, Renato, Enrico and Amleto, appearing opposite some of the finest singers of his day. No bel canto specialist, he was at his best in ardent verismo works, creating the roles of Gerard in Giordano's Andrea Chénier in 1896 and Cascart in Leoncavallo's Zazà in 1900.

Sammarco was active during an era that was thronged with Italian baritones of exceptional ability. It was no small achievement for him to carve out a lucrative international career in the face of powerful competition from the likes of Mattia Battistini, Antonio Magini-Coletti, Giuseppe Campanari, Mario Ancona, Giuseppe Pacini, Antonio Scotti, Eugenio Giraldoni, Riccardo Stracciari, Titta Ruffo, Domenico Viglione Borghese, Pasquale Amato and Carlo Galeffi.

He taught singing after retiring from the stage and died in Milan. One of his pupils was Sándor Svéd.

Recordings
Sammarco possessed a strong voice with a powerful upper register; but of all the celebrated singers preserved on early recordings, Sammarco's are regarded as the most disappointing. The technical quality of his singing disappoints and the timbre of his voice can sound rough. On record, according to Scott and Steane, he has a singular inability to sing less than mezzo forte and seems to have no concept of legato. He impresses most when delivering declamatory passages in verismo operas (see Scott, cited below) including an early (celebrated or notorious) recording with the soprano Emma Carelli from Tosca, complete with peals of laughter. Many of the numerous 78-rpm gramophone records that he made prior to World War I for the Fonotipia, Victor and Pathé companies—and for the forerunner of HMV—are now available on CD reissues from various labels.

Sources 
Celletti, Rodolfo  (1964). Le Grandi Voci. Istituto per la Collaborazione Culturale (Rome) 
 Kutsch, K. J. and Riemens, Leo (1969). A Biographical Dictionary of Singers. Chilton Book Company (New York)
Warrack, John and West, Ewan (1992), The Oxford Dictionary of Opera, 782 pages, 
Scott, Michael (1977), The Record of Singing (Volume One). Duckworth (London), 243 pages, 

1868 births
1930 deaths
Musicians from Palermo
Italian operatic baritones
Fonotipia Records artists
19th-century Italian male opera singers
20th-century Italian male opera singers